Farmville Historic District is a national historic district located at Farmville, Prince Edward County, Virginia. It encompasses 246 contributing buildings and 1 contributing object (the Confederate Monument) in the central business district and surrounding residential areas of Farmville.  It includes a variety of commercial, residential, institutional, and industrial buildings dating from the mid-19th to early-20th centuries.  Notable buildings include the Paulett-Gill house (c. 1858), Farmville Presbyterian Church (1828, 1859), Johns Memorial Episcopal Church (1881), Farmville Methodist Church (1907), Hotel Weyanoke (1925), the warehouses of the Dunnington Tobacco Company and Central Virginia Processing, Inc., the former Craddock-Terry Shoe Company, the former Cunningham and Company tobacco prizery, Norfolk and Western Railroad passenger station (c. 1905), Doyne Building (c. 1890), the Watkins M. Abbitt Federal Building (1917), Prince Edward County Courthouse, and the former Farmville High School (1913).  Located in the district is the separately listed First Baptist Church.

It was listed on the National Register of Historic Places in 1989.

References

National Register of Historic Places in Prince Edward County, Virginia
Federal architecture in Virginia
Greek Revival architecture in Virginia
Victorian architecture in Virginia
Geography of Prince Edward County, Virginia
Historic districts on the National Register of Historic Places in Virginia